Gan Tiancheng (born 20 January 1995) is a Chinese footballer.

Career statistics

Club

Notes

References

1995 births
Living people
Chinese footballers
Association football midfielders
Guangzhou F.C. players
Footballers from Guangzhou
21st-century Chinese people